Hepatic leukemia factor is a protein that in humans is encoded by the HLF gene.

Function 

This gene encodes a member of the proline and acidic-rich (PAR) protein family, a subset of the bZIP transcription factors. The encoded protein forms homodimers or heterodimers with other PAR family members and binds sequence-specific promoter elements to activate transcription. Chromosomal translocations fusing portions of this gene with the E2A gene cause a subset of childhood B-lineage acute lymphoid leukemias. Alternatively spliced transcript variants have been described, but their biological validity has not been determined.

References

Further reading

External links 
 

Transcription factors